The Andrew Carnegie Mansion is a historic house located at 2 East 91st Street at Fifth Avenue in the Upper East Side of Manhattan, New York City, New York. Andrew Carnegie moved into his newly completed mansion in late 1902 and lived there until his death in 1919; his wife, Louise, continued to live there until her death in 1946. The building is now the Cooper-Hewitt, Smithsonian Design Museum, part of the Smithsonian Institution. The surrounding area, part of the larger Upper East Side neighborhood, has come to be called Carnegie Hill. The mansion was named a National Historic Landmark in 1966.

History
The land was purchased in 1898 in secrecy by Carnegie, more than a mile north of what was then fashionable society, in part to ensure there was enough space for a garden. He asked his architects Babb, Cook & Willard for the "most modest, plainest, and most roomy house in New York". However, it was also the first American residence to have a steel frame and among the first to have a private Otis Elevator and central heating. His wife, Louise, lived in the house until she died in 1946. From 1949 to 1971, the Columbia School of Social Work was located at the Carnegie Mansion, until the school was moved to its current location on Columbia's main campus.

The Carnegie Corporation gave the house and property to the Smithsonian in 1972, and the modern incarnation of the Cooper-Hewitt Museum opened there in 1976. Hardy Holzman Pfeiffer Associates handled the renovation into a museum in 1977. The interior was redesigned by the architectural firm, Polshek and Partners, headed by James Polshek, in 2001.

The mansion was used in the 1973 musical film Godspell for the number "Turn Back, O Man."

Description
It is a -story structure, finished in brick and stone. It is stylistically an eclectic variation of the Georgian Revival, with stone ashlar corner quoining, windows with heavy stone trim, and a dentillated cornice topped by an urned balustrade. A grassy lawn separates the house from 91st Street, and there is a small garden on its west side. Just east of the mansion proper is a townhouse that was purchased by Carnegie soon after its 1905 construction as a residence for his daughter. This building forms part of the current complex, although its interior has been modernized and converted to office and administrative uses by the Smithsonian.

See also
List of Gilded Age mansions
National Register of Historic Places listings in Manhattan from 59th to 110th Streets
List of National Historic Landmarks in New York City

References

Further reading
 
 Ewing, Heather. (2014). Life of a Mansion: The Story of Cooper Hewitt, Smithsonian Design Museum. Cooper Hewitt, Smithsonian Design Museum, New York.

External links 

Cooper Hewitt, National Design Museum

Andrew Carnegie
Babb, Cook and Willard buildings
Fifth Avenue
Houses completed in 1903
Houses in Manhattan
Houses on the National Register of Historic Places in Manhattan
National Historic Landmarks in Manhattan
New York City Designated Landmarks in Manhattan
Upper East Side
Gilded Age mansions
1903 establishments in New York City